The Nosy Mamoko skink (Paracontias milloti) is a species of skinks. It is endemic to Madagascar.

References

Paracontias
Reptiles described in 1949
Taxa named by Fernand Angel
Reptiles of Madagascar